N-acetylglucosaminyltransferase I may refer to:
 A-1,3-mannosyl-glycoprotein 2-b-N-acetylglucosaminyltransferase, an enzyme
 Protein N-acetylglucosaminyltransferase, an enzyme